The siege of Smolensk was an unsuccessful attempt to capture Smolensk by the forces of the Grand Duchy of Moscow in summer 1502. It was the last major military engagement during the Muscovite–Lithuanian War (1500–1503). 

Smolensk, a strong and strategically important fortress, was a part of the Grand Duchy of Lithuania since 1404. Ivan III of Russia launched the second Muscovite–Lithuanian War in 1500 and Lithuanians suffered a great defeat in the Battle of Vedrosha. Stanisław Kiszka became regent of Smolensk in 1499 and ordered improvements to Smolensk Kremlin. By the time the Russian army, commanded by Ivan's son , reached Smolensk in June 1502, Smolensk was well-prepared for the siege.

The Russian army plundered Orsha and Vitebsk and attacked Smolensk with artillery. Their assault on 16 September was not only repelled but the defense grew into a counterattack. The indecisive but bloody Battle of Lake Smolino in September as well as Lithuanian reinforcements brought by Great Hetman (commander of the army) Stanislovas Kęsgaila, forced the Russians to retreat.

Peace negotiations began while the army was still at Smolensk. A six-year truce was concluded on the Feast of the Annunciation (March 25) in 1503. In recognition of his defense of Smolensk, Kiszka was promoted to Great Hetman in 1503. Ivan III succeeded in capturing Smolensk in 1514.

References

Smolensk
1502 in Europe
Smolensk
Smolensk
Smolensk